Lê Hữu Trác (1724 in Hưng Yên – 1791 in Hà Tĩnh) or alias Hải Thượng Lãn Ông, was an 18th-century Vietnamese physician who was the best known and most celebrated doctor in Vietnamese history. Hữu Trác was conscripted into the army in 1740 at the age of sixteen. In 1746 he withdrew from the army after his eldest brother died and lived in Hương Sơn District with his old mother. His own son died in a smallpox epidemic in 1758 when he was five. He then spent the next fifteen years in learning medicine, with focus on curing smallpox. He traveled to Hanoi in 1782 in order of lord Trinh Sam to treat the Crown Prince.

Works 
 Practice of the Lazy Master of Hai Thuong (Hải Thượng y tông tâm lĩnh) 
 Confused Attempts at Diagnosing Smallpox (Mộng trung giác đậu)
 Thượng kinh ký sự

References 

 
 

1724 births
1791 deaths
People from Hưng Yên Province
18th-century Vietnamese physicians
Acupuncturists